Beaver Dam is a city in Dodge County, Wisconsin, United States, along Beaver Dam Lake and the Beaver Dam River. The population was 16,708 at the 2020 census, making it the largest city primarily located in Dodge County. It is the principal city of the Beaver Dam Micropolitan Statistical area. The city is adjacent to the Town of Beaver Dam.

History
Beaver Dam was first settled by Thomas Mackie and Joseph Goetschius in 1841, and by 1843 had a population of almost 100. The city was named for an old beaver dam located in a stream flowing into Beaver Dam River. The area had also been known as Okwaanim, Chippewa for beaver dam. The community was incorporated as a city on March 18, 1856. That same year the Milwaukee Railroad reached the area, encouraging further growth.

Beaver Dam hosted a World War II prisoner of war camp called Camp Beaver Dam in the summer of 1944. The camp held 300 German prisoners in a tent city encampment where the Wayland Academy field house now stands.

Geography and climate

Beaver Dam is located at  (43.459967, −88.836066).

Beaver Dam has a warm-summer humid continental climate (Köppen: Dfb). Since 1996, the average annual snowfall in Beaver Dam has been .

Normal temperatures

Normal precipitation

Snowfall

Demographics

2020 census
As of the census of 2020, the population was 16,708. The racial makeup of the city was 85.0% White, 1.7% Black or African American, 0.9% Asian, 0.3% Native American, 4.7% from other races, and 7.3% from two or more races. Ethnically, the population was 11.5% Hispanic or Latino of any race.

According  to the American Community Survey estimates for 2016-2020, the median income for a household in the city was $55,551, and the median income for a family was $73,309. Male full-time workers had a median income of $48,773 versus $40,140 for female workers. The per capita income for the city was $30,729. About 6.2% of families and 8.3% of the population were below the poverty line, including 11.2% of those under age 18 and 7.0% of those age 65 or over. Of the population age 25 and over, 93.0% were high school graduates or higher and 21.4% had a bachelor's degree or higher.

2010 census

As of the census of 2010, there were 16,214 people, 6,819 households, and 4,113 families residing in the city. The racial makeup of the city was 93.0% White, 0.8% African American, 0.3% Native American, 1.0% Asian, 3.4% from other races, and 1.5% from two or more races. Hispanic or Latino of any race were 7.5% of the population.

There were 6,819 households, of which 30.6% had children under the age of 18 living with them, 43.1% were married couples living together, 12.1% had a female householder with no husband present, 5.1% had a male householder with no wife present, and 39.7% were non-families. 33.7% of all households were made up of individuals, and 14.6% had someone living alone who was 65 years of age or older. The average household size was 2.32 and the average family size was 2.95.

The median age in the city was 37.7 years. 25.1% of residents were under the age of 18; 7.7% were between the ages of 18 and 24; 26.1% were from 25 to 44; 25% were from 45 to 64; and 16.1% were 65 years of age or older. The gender makeup of the city was 48.4% male and 51.6% female.

2000 census
As of the census of 2000, there were 15,169 people, 6,349 households, and 3,999 families residing in the city. The population density was 2,904.6 people per square mile (1,122.0/km). There were 6,685 housing units at an average density of 1,280.1 per square mile (494.5/km). The racial makeup of the city was 95.95% White, 0.44% Black or African American, 0.32% Native American, 0.61% Asian, 0.05% Pacific Islander, 1.61% from other races, and 1.04% from two or more races. 4.22% of the population were Hispanic or Latino of any race.

There were 6,349 households, out of which 31.3% had children under the age of 18 living with them, 49.0% were married couples living together, 10.4% had a female householder with no husband present, and 37.0% were non-families. 31.3% of all households were made up of individuals, and 13.8% had someone living alone who was 65 years of age or older. The average household size was 2.35 and the average family size was 2.94.

In the city, the population was spread out, with 25.0% under the age of 18, 8.2% from 18 to 24, 29.3% from 25 to 44, 21.1% from 45 to 64, and 16.5% who were 65 years of age or older. The median age was 37 years. For every 100 females, there were 93.2 males. For every 100 females age 18 and over, there were 89.7 males.

Education
The Beaver Dam Unified School District provides public education in the area.

Primary education

Beaver Dam's five public primary schools for K to 5th grades are: Jefferson Elementary, Lincoln Elementary, Prairie View Elementary,  Washington Elementary, and Wilson Elementary.

There are two parochial primary schools: St. Katharine Drexel (grades: Pre-K to 8th), and St. Stephen's Evangelical Lutheran (grades: K to 8th).

Middle school
Beaver Dam Middle School is the local public middle school teaching 6th through 8th grades.

Secondary education
Beaver Dam High School is the local public high school; its mascot is The Golden Beaver. An alternative school, the Don Smith Learning Academy, is part of the Beaver Dam Unified School District.

The city is also home to

Wayland Academy, a private school.

Post-secondary education
The Beaver Dam campus of Moraine Park Technical College is located in the city.

Healthcare 
Marshfield Medical Center-Beaver Dam is a 163 bed hospital. There are 44.4 primary care physicians per 100,000 population in Beaver Dam. The area is designated as both a mental health and primary care Health Professional Shortage Area (HPSA) qualifying the region as a medical desert. By 2035, Beaver Dam is expected to have 48.4% deficit in primary care physicians, the eighth largest predicted deficit in Wisconsin. There are two behavioral health professionals in Beaver Dam.

Gallery

Events
The following events are held each year in Beaver Dam, WI:

January:
 Cabin Fever Fest – 4th Sunday

March:
 Kiwanis Pancake Breakfast – 1st Sunday

April:
 Rotary Casino Night – 1st Saturday
 Beaver Dam Area Orchestra Annual Spring Concert – 3rd Saturday

May:
 Race Into Summer Festival – Sunday of Memorial Day weekend
 Memorial Day Parade – Memorial Day

June:
 Taste of Wisconsin (beer & cheese tasting) – Saturday before Father's Day
 Swan City Classic Car Show – Father's Day

July:
 Lake Days / Swan Park Craft Fair – 2nd weekend

August:
 Corn Roast – 1st Thursday
 Dodge County Fair – 3rd Wednesday through the following Sunday

November:
 Midwest Cream Cheese Competition – Saturday of opening of deer hunting
 Economic Update Luncheon – 3rd Wednesday

December:
 Christmas Parade – 1st Saturday

Government
Beaver Dam is represented by Glenn Grothman (R) in the United States House of Representatives, and by Ron Johnson (R) and Tammy Baldwin (D) in the United States Senate. John Jagler (R) represents Beaver Dam in the Wisconsin State Senate, and Mark Born (R) in the Wisconsin State Assembly.

References in popular media

Films shot in Beaver Dam
Public Enemies (2009) starring Johnny Depp, Marion Cotillard & Christian Bale
The Pit (1981) starring Sammy Snyders & Jeannie Elias
Thirteen Hours by Air (1936) starring Fred MacMurray & Joan Bennett

Films shot about Beaver Dam
 Yoga Matt (2008) (short) starring Saturday Night Live & MADtv actors
 Pardon My Past (1945) starring Fred MacMurray with many references to Beaver Dam

Films referencing Beaver Dam
 For Me and My Gal (1942) in which "Beaverdam, Wis." is the first stop for Palmer & Hayden after they team up.
  Pardon My Past (1945) in which "Beaverdam, Wis." is the destination of Eddie and Chuck to start a mink farm after leaving the service.

Notable people

Government

 Claire B. Bird, Wisconsin State Senator 
 Mark Born, Wisconsin state legislator
 Samuel D. Burchard, U.S. Representative 
 Michael E. Burke, U.S. Representative 
 Jesse A. Canniff. Wisconsin state legislator, farmer, businessman
 Columbus Germain, Wisconsin legislator
 David C. Gowdey, member of the Wisconsin State Assembly
 Charles M. Hambright, Wisconsin State Representative
 Michael A. Jacobs, Wisconsin State Senator
 Andre Jacque, member of the Wisconsin State Assembly
 Edwin J. Jones, Minnesota state senator
 William Jones, member of the Wisconsin State Assembly
 Robert Kastenmeier, U.S. Representative 
 Daniel E. La Bar, Wisconsin State Representative
 Walter J. LaBuy, U.S. District Court Judge in Illinois 
 Silas W. Lamoreaux, lawyer and politician 
 Henry W. Lander, Wisconsin State Senator and Mayor of Beaver Dam
 Edward C. McFetridge, mayor of Beaver Dam
 George F. Merrill, Wisconsin State Senator
 Eric Oemig, former Washington State Senator
 Charles Pettibone, Wisconsin State Senator
 Dick Pabich,  LGBTQ activist and campaign manager of Harvey Milk
 John Samuel Rowell,  politician, agricultural inventor, and pioneer manufacturer
 Benjamin Sherman, Wisconsin legislator
 A. Scott Sloan, U.S. Representative 
 John Mellen Thurston, U.S. Senator from Nebraska, Thurston County, Nebraska is named after him
 Philip J. Zink, Wisconsin legislator

Professional sports

 Eric Baldwin, professional poker player 
 Paul Cloyd, professional basketball player 
 Ric Flair, wrestler 
 Pink Hawley, major league baseball player 
 Addie Joss, MLB player, member of the National Baseball Hall of Fame 
 Lyman Linde, MLB player 
 Doug Lloyd, professional football player 
 Jason Maas, professional football player 
 David Maley, NHL player 
 Bill Rentmeester, NFL/UFL player 
 Elmer Rhenstrom, NFL player 
 Gil Sterr, NFL player 
 Barney Traynor, NFL player

Business

 Lina Trivedi, co-creator of (Beanie Babies)
 Frederick Douglas Underwood, President of Erie Railroad, Director of Wells Fargo

Science, media, and the arts

 Delia Akeley, explorer 
 Edward Creutz, physicist
 Brian Donlevy, actor 
 Lois Ehlert, illustrator, Caldecott Medal recipient 
 Zona Gale, writer 
 Raymond Z. Gallun, writer 
 Bobby Hatfield, singer, best known as one of The Righteous Brothers singing duo 
 Fred MacMurray, actor 
 Parry Moon, electrical engineer, author 
 Kira Salak, writer, adventurer, journalist, attended Wayland Academy
 Nancy Zieman, television sewing host, author and businesswoman

References

External links

City of Beaver Dam
Beaver Dam Chamber of Commerce

 

 
Cities in Wisconsin
Cities in Dodge County, Wisconsin
Micropolitan areas of Wisconsin
Populated places established in 1841
1841 establishments in Wisconsin Territory